Pueblo Union Depot is the historic railroad station in Pueblo, Colorado.  It was built in the Richardsonian Romanesque style in 1889–1890 and added to the National Register of Historic Places in 1975. It is located within the Union Avenue Historic Commercial District.

History
Initially the station was served by the Denver & Rio Grande Western Railroad, the Atchison, Topeka and Santa Fe Railway, the Colorado & Southern Railway (which was acquired by the Chicago, Burlington and Quincy Railroad in 1908), the Missouri Pacific Railroad, and the Chicago Rock Island & Pacific Railroad.  Today the Union Pacific Railroad and the BNSF Railroad share use of the tracks, and the depot is privately owned. Regular passenger train service no longer exists, though there are proposals such as Front Range Passenger Rail, which would provide service to Denver and Colorado Springs. In addition, the depot has been proposed to operate on Amtrak's Southwest Chief.

Presidents Theodore Roosevelt and Woodrow Wilson arrived at the depot, as did Vice-Presidential candidate Joe Biden and Presidential candidate John Kerry.

References

External links

Official site
Colorado Historical Society

Railway stations on the National Register of Historic Places in Colorado
Clock towers in Colorado
Pueblo, Colorado
Pueblo, Colorado
Pueblo
Pueblo, Colorado
Pueblo
Pueblo
Former railway stations in Colorado
Richardsonian Romanesque architecture in Colorado
National Register of Historic Places in Pueblo, Colorado
Transportation buildings and structures in Pueblo County, Colorado
Railway stations in the United States opened in 1890
1890 establishments in Colorado